The Hours of John the Fearless was an illuminated book of Hours produced in Flanders between 1406 and 1415 for John the Fearless. It contains 12 illustrated saints' calendars, 28 major miniatures and rectangular and acanthus-leaf borders, all following the Rome liturgy of the Hours. It is now in the Bibliothéque Nationale, Paris.

15th-century illuminated manuscripts
John the Fearless
Bibliothèque nationale de France collections